
This is a list of bridges documented by the Historic American Engineering Record in the U.S. state of Missouri.

Bridges

Notes

References

List
List
Missouri
Bridges, HAER
Bridges, HAER
Bridges